Diacrodon is a monotypic genus of flowering plants in the family Rubiaceae. The genus contains only one species, viz. Diacrodon compressus, which is endemic to northeastern Brazil.

References

External links
Diacrodon in the World Checklist of Rubiaceae

Monotypic Rubiaceae genera